The 2010 ICC World Cricket League Division Five was a cricket tournament that took place in February 2010 in Nepal. It formed part of the World Cricket League competition administered by the International Cricket Council, the international governing body for cricket. The tournament was won by Nepal who defeated the United States by 5 wickets in the final.

Teams

Squads

Group stage

Fixtures

Play-offs

Statistics

Post-tournament

After the conclusion of the tournament the teams were distributed as follows:

 & : Promoted to 2010 Division Four
& : Remain in 2012 Division Five
 & : Relegated to 2011 Division Six

The match between USA and Nepal on 26 February was under investigation by the ICC for the crowd trouble and the calculations of the net-run rate which denied Singapore promotion to Division 4.  On 9 May, the ICC released a report, which upheld the umpires decisions during the match and retained the outcome of the tournament.

TV coverage 
The tournament was covered live on Nepal Television's second channel NTV2 or NTV Metro. This was the first time that any World Cricket League tournament was being broadcast live on TV. Only the games at Tribhuvan University ground were broadcast live.

References

International cricket competitions in 2010
2010 in cricket
2010, 5
International cricket competitions in Nepal
2010 in Nepalese sport